Shaheenbag is a neighborhood in Tejgaon Dhaka District in the Division of Dhaka, Bangladesh. It is a large area in the centre of Dhaka, the capital of Bangladesh. This is an important area of Dhaka city as prime minister's office is located near it. It is bounded by Mohakhali to the north, Old Airport Road to the west, Tejgaon Industrial Area, Kawran Bazar, West Nakhalpara, Tejturi Bazar and Tejkunipara to the south and BAF Shaheen College, Dhaka Cantonment to the east.

References 

Neighbourhoods in Bangladesh